Seymour Peak is a 6,337-foot-elevation (1,932 meter) mountain summit located in Mount Rainier National Park in Pierce County of Washington state. It is part of the Cascade Range and is situated southeast of Cayuse Pass and northeast of Shriner Peak. Its nearest higher neighbor is Dewey Peak,  to the east. Seymour Peak is named for William Wolcott Seymour (1861-1929), mayor of Tacoma, Washington, from 1911 to 1914. He was also a philanthropist, mountaineer, and a contributor to the scouting movement. This landform's name was officially adopted in 1932 by the U.S. Board on Geographic Names. Precipitation runoff from Seymour Peak drains into tributaries of the Cowlitz River.

Climate
Seymour Peak is located in the marine west coast climate zone of western North America. Most weather fronts originate in the Pacific Ocean, and travel northeast toward the Cascade Mountains. As fronts approach, they are forced upward by the peaks of the Cascade Range (Orographic lift), causing them to drop their moisture in the form of rain or snowfall onto the Cascades. As a result, the west side of the Cascades experiences high precipitation, especially during the winter months in the form of snowfall. Because of maritime influence, snow tends to be wet and heavy, resulting in avalanche danger. During winter months, weather is usually cloudy, but, due to high pressure systems over the Pacific Ocean that intensify during summer months, there is often little or no cloud cover during the summer.

References

External links
 Weather forecast: Seymour Peak
 National Park Service web site: Mount Rainier National Park

Cascade Range
Mountains of Pierce County, Washington
Mountains of Washington (state)
Mount Rainier National Park
North American 1000 m summits